The Southdean Covered Court Championships was an indoor tennis tournament established in 1934 at the Southdean Sports Club, Middleton-on-Sea, West Sussex, England. The championships ran until 1952 when they were discontinued.

History
In 1922 Sir Walter Aston Blount, 10th Baronet created a New City holiday resort in the former seaplane factory south of the church. One of the hangars accommodated a dance hall and another indoor tennis courts; there were also outdoor tennis courts, a putting green.

The New City had its own hotel accommodation, dairy, farm, ice generating plant, and mineral water factory, besides a laundry, hairdressing rooms, and lending library. By 1934 the New City had become the Southdean hotel and sports club, which in 1937 was open to nonresidents, and which by then could offer squash courts and a sea-water swimming pool. In 1934 the Southdean Covered Court Championships was established at the Southdean Sports Club. The championships were staged through till 1952 before being discontinued.

Venue
The Southdean Sports Club was founded in 1934. In 1953 the club's facilties included  2 covered courts and 2 badminton courts for indoor use plus 6 grass courts, and 4 hard courts for outdoor tennis. In 1997 Southdean Sports Club was renamed to the Middleton Sports Club.

References

Defunct tennis tournaments in the United Kingdom
Indoor tennis tournaments
Wood court tennis tournaments